Pugettia is a genus of kelp crabs, in the family Epialtidae. It comprises the following species:
Pugettia dalli Rathbun, 1894 – spined kelp crab
Pugettia elongata Yokoya, 1933
Pugettia gracilis Dana, 1851 – graceful kelp crab
Pugettia hubbsi Garth, 1958
Pugettia incisa (De Haan, 1839)
Pugettia intermedia Sakai, 1938
Pugettia kagoshimensis Rathbun, 1933
Pugettia leytensis Rathbun, 1916
Pugettia marissinica Takeda & Miyake, 1972
Pugettia mindanaoensis Rathbun, 1916
Pugettia minor Ortmann, 1893
Pugettia nipponensis Rathbun, 1932
Pugettia pellucens Rathbun, 1932
Pugettia producta (Randall, 1840) – northern kelp crab or shield-backed kelp crab
Pugettia quadridens (De Haan, 1839)
Pugettia richii Dana, 1851 – cryptic kelp crab
Pugettia similis Rathbun, 1932
Pugettia tasmanensis Richer de Forges, 1993
Pugettia venetiae Rathbun, 1924 – Venice kelp crab

References

Majoidea